Anderson Oliveira Almeida (born December 14, 1980), commonly known as Anderson do Ó, is a retired Brazilian footballer.

Simurq
In July 2013 signed a new 1-year contract with Simurq.

Career statistics

References

External links

Globo Esporte's Futpedia

1980 births
Living people
Brazilian expatriate footballers
Madureira Esporte Clube players
Ceará Sporting Club players
Club Blooming players
CR Vasco da Gama players
Levadiakos F.C. players
Vitória F.C. players
AEP Paphos FC players
FC Vaslui players
Primeira Liga players
Super League Greece players
Liga I players
Cypriot First Division players
Expatriate footballers in Bolivia
Expatriate footballers in Greece
Expatriate footballers in Portugal
Expatriate footballers in Azerbaijan
Brazilian expatriate sportspeople in Greece
Expatriate footballers in Cyprus
Brazilian expatriate sportspeople in Bolivia
Association football defenders
Footballers from Rio de Janeiro (city)
Brazilian footballers